The 2018–19 Western Sydney Wanderers FC season was the club's seventh season since its establishment in 2012. The club participated in the A-League for the seventh time and the FFA Cup for the fifth time.

Players

Squad information

From youth squad

Transfers in

Transfers out

Contract extensions

Squad statistics

Appearances and goals

|-
|colspan="14"|Players no longer at the club

† = Scholarship or NPL/NYL-listed player

Pre-season and friendlies

Competitions

Overall

A-League

League table

Results summary

Results by round

Matches

FFA Cup

References

External links
 Official Website

2018–19 A-League season by team
Western Sydney Wanderers FC seasons